Sir Charles Sargent (1821 – 21 June 1900) was the Chief Justice of the Bombay High Court.

Early life
Sargent completed his education at Trinity College, Cambridge where he took his M.A. and achieved the distinction of being Fifth Wrangler. He was called to the Bar at Lincoln's Inn in 1848.

Career
Before coming to India Sargent was a member of Supreme Council of Justice of the Ionian Islands and also its Chief Justice for six years. He joined in the Bombay High Court in 1866 as Puisne Judge and after the retirement of Michael Roberts Westropp he became the Chief Justice in 1882. His judgments were generally short, lucid and free from political or racial bias. He served there up to 1895.

References

1821 births
1900 deaths
Knights Commander of the Order of the Indian Empire
Chief Justices of the Bombay High Court
British India judges
19th-century English judges